The Dévastation-class ironclads were a class of ironclad battleships that were laid down as part of the 1872 programme.  They were a development of the 1876 ironclad .  The class consisted of Dévastation and Courbet.

Design

The Dévastation-class ironclads were authorized under the naval construction Program of 1872, which began with the ironclad  that year. Shortly thereafter, Italy began work on the very large s in the early 1870s, but the French initially ignored the development and instead chose to base the design for its next ironclad on that of Redoutable. The new ship was to be enlarged significantly to incorporate a more powerful armament. The design for the new ships was prepared in early 1875 by Louis de Bussy, who had also designed Redoutable; he originally intended to arm the new ship with four  guns and two  guns, the former in a central casemate and the latter in open barbettes above the casemate. 

The  (Board of Construction) examined his initial proposal on 16 March 1875, and made several requests for changes. These included changes to the arrangement of some of the guns, an extension of the armor deck for the entire length of the ship, and the addition of a second propeller.

The naval minister, Léon Martin Fourichon, approved the design on 11 May, and authorized the construction of two ships, Dévastation and Foudroyant, which was subsequently renamed Courbet in 1885, which were the largest central battery ships ever built by any navy. The navy continued to make changes to the design; the 320 mm guns were replaced with  weapons, and two more 274.4 mm guns were added as chase weapons. They are sometimes called the Courbet class, as she had begun construction first, though Dévastation was launched and completed earlier.

Characteristics and machinery

They displaced . As was standard for French capital ships of the period, they had a pronounced ram bow and tumblehome sides. Their hulls were of mixed iron and steel construction. They were fitted with three pole masts equipped with spotting tops for their main battery guns. Steering was controlled with a single rudder, though the ships proved to be difficult to maneuver. The crew varied between 689 and 721 officers and enlisted men.

Their propulsion machinery consisted of two compound steam engines of the Woolf pattern, with steam provided by twelve coal-burning fire-tube boilers, which were ducted into a pair of funnels placed side-by-side amidships. To supplement the steam engines, Dévastation was equipped with a three-masted full-ship rig, though this was quickly reduced to a barque rig. Courbet, meanwhile, received a three-masted schooner rig.

Armament and armor
The ships' main battery consisted of four 340 mm guns mounted in a central, armored casemate. Two guns could fire ahead on a limited arc and two could fire astern. The guns carried aboard Dévastation were 18-caliber M1875 models, while Courbet received longer 21-caliber M1881 variants. These were supported by a secondary battery four 274.4 mm guns; Dévastations were 18-caliber M1870 weapons and Courbets were slightly longer 19.75-caliber M1875 pieces. One was in the bow under the forecastle, two were in open barbette mounts on the upper deck amidships, and the fourth was on the upper deck at the stern.

They were also armed with a tertiary battery of six  guns, 21-caliber M1870M type aboard Dévastation and 30-caliber M1881 breech-loading guns aboard Courbet. A pair was carried forward of the main battery, one gun per broadside, and the remaining four were astern, two per broadside. For defense against torpedo boats, Dévastation carried eight  1-pounder Hotchkiss revolver cannon, all in individual mounts, while Courbet was completed with eighteen of the guns. Courbet also carried a pair of  landing guns for use ashore, and a  revolver cannon for one of her steam pinnaces. Their armament was rounded out with four  torpedo tubes in above-water launchers for Dévastation and five of the tubes for Courbet. The former's tubes were above water, two per broadside, while Courbet carried two of hers in the bow, one on each broadside, and the fifth in the stern, all above water.

It was connected to the upper edge of the armor belt.

Modifications

Both ships were modernized several times throughout their careers. Dévastation had her main battery guns replaced with four  20-caliber M1875–81 guns, and an additional four 47 mm revolver cannon and two 37 mm revolvers were added. Her armament was altered again in 1896, a pair of  quick-firing guns were added, the 47 mm revolvers were replaced with six single-barrel 47 mm quick-firing guns, and the number of 37 mm revolver cannon was increased to twenty. In 1901, Dévastation had a new, armored conning tower installed in place of the original light structure. The new tower had  of armor plate on the sides. At the same time, her propulsion system was replaced with new vertical triple-expansion steam engines and twelve Belleville boilers of the water-tube type. Work on the ship was finished in 1902.

In 1894, Courbets light armament was revised to include eighteen  guns and seven 37 mm revolver cannon. More extensive work was carried out in 1897, when the ship received a new, larger conning tower with 80 mm of armor plate. The light guns that had been present in her upper fighting tops were removed, as were the two forward torpedo tubes. In addition, the gun shields fitted to the barbette guns were replaced with vertical armor plates on the front. The ship also received new fire-tube boilers to replace the worn-out boilers. The Navy had intended to completely rearm the ship, but a change in naval ministers led to a shift in priorities, so the alterations to the main and secondary batteries were deferred. Additional work was carried out between September 1899 and December 1900. Her existing masts and bowsprit were removed, and two larger military masts with two fighting tops apiece were installed in their place. Her 270 mm guns were removed; the bow position received a 138.6 mm 30-caliber M1881/84 gun, while the three barbette positions had 240 mm 40-caliber M1893 guns. Her light battery was revised again slightly, to sixteen of the 47 mm guns, eight 37 mm revolvers, and two 37 mm guns.

Ships
Courbet was originally named Foudroyant ("Lightning"), but on 25 June 1885, she was renamed to honor Admiral Amédée Courbet, who had died of cholera after leading French naval forces through much of the Sino-French War.

Service history

Footnotes

Notes

Citations

References

Further reading
 

 
Ships built in France
Ship classes of the French Navy